
Etang de la Moubra or Lac de la Moubra is a lake at Montana in the canton of Valais, Switzerland. Located at an elevation of 1424 m, its surface area is 5 ha.

See also
List of mountain lakes of Switzerland

External links 

Moubra